The Mishmi Garra (Garra rupecula) is a species of ray-finned fish in the genus Garra. It is endemic to north-eastern India.

References 

Garra